Léon Braeckeveldt (20 February 1894 – 19 February 1973) was a Belgian racing cyclist. He rode in the 1922 Tour de France.

References

1894 births
1973 deaths
Belgian male cyclists
Place of birth missing